Birnin Kebbi is a city located in Northwestern Nigeria. It is the capital city of Kebbi State and headquarter of the Gwandu Emirate. As of 2007 the city had an estimated population of 125,594 people.
Kebbi is mostly a Hausa and Fulani state, with Islam as the major religion.
Formerly it was the capital of the Kebbi Emirate, which relocated to Argungu after the conquest by Gwandu in 1831.

Health Care

Birnin Kebbi has many hospitals and medical facilities, some of which were established since before the Nigerian Independence. For example, the oldest hospital in Birnin Kebbi is found to be Sir Yahaya Memorial Hospital. Federal Medical Center   can also be found in Birnin Kebbi metropolis.

Other private healthcare include:

• Godiya Hospital Birnin Kebbi

• Salima Private Clinic

• Medicaid Cancer Foundation

Geography 

Birnin Kebbi is located on the Sokoto River and is connected by road to Argungu (45 km northeast), Jega (35 km southeast), and Bunza (45 km southwest)and the city is dominated by the Fulani ethnic group

Transportation 
The city is served by the Sir Ahmadu Bello International Airport.

References 

Local Government Areas in Kebbi State
State capitals in Nigeria
Sokoto River